Get Used to It is a funk album by the Brand New Heavies released 27 June 2006 via Starbucks and more traditional music retail outlets.

Background 
Get Used to It is the first album with lead singer N'Dea Davenport since she departed the band after the release of their 1994 album Brother Sister for a solo career. Following the band's reunion with Davenport. They also reunited with their former record label Delicious Vinyl. The album was recorded in New York and London. In early May, they released the lead single "I Don't Know Why (I Love You)," a cover of the Stevie Wonder song that was the B-side to his 1968 hit single "My Cherie Amour." The band toured at the end of 2006.

Tom Moulton mixes 
"I Don't Know Why (I Love You)" was notable for being one of very few late releases to feature the trademarked A Tom Moulton Mix, as the legendary disco pioneer had been asked to contribute mixes. Impressed with the Heavies, the pioneering engineer eventually took on the task of remixing the entire Get Used To It. Unfortunately, the album's original mix was already finished and on its way to press. The new mixes were eventually re-released as Get Used To It: The Tom Moulton Mixes with a new cover featuring only Moulton's image. The digital re-release also made available instrumental mixes of each Tom Moulton mix.

Track listing

Personnel
The Brand New Heavies
N'Dea Davenport – vocals
Simon Bartholomew – guitar, background vocals
Andrew Levy – bass guitar, programming, background vocals
Jan Kincaid – percussion, drums, keyboards, vocals, background vocals

Musicians
Neal Evans – clavinet
Gilbert Fuentes – engineer
Anna Giddey – violin
Dominic Glover – trumpet
James A. Hunt – saxophone
Mike Makowski – engineer
Andy Marcinkowski – assistant
Mike Pelanconi – engineer, drum engineering
Mark Ralph – programming, engineer, mixing
Ari Raskin – guitar, engineer, mixing
Michael C. Ross – producer, executive producer, mixing
Katherine Shave – viola
Sy Smith – background vocals
Nichol Thompson – trombone
Howie Weinberg – mastering
Lucy Wilkins – violin, leader
Chris Worsey – cello

Additional personnel
Dina Juntila – photography & art conception

References

The Brand New Heavies albums
2006 albums